Steven Cummings is an American comic book artist.

Steven Cummings is also the name of:

Steve Cummings (born 1981), British cyclist
Steven Cummings (footballer), Australian rules footballer
Steve Cummings (baseball) (born 1964), former American professional baseball player
Stephen Cummings (born 1954), 1980s Australian pop music artist
Steven R. Cummings, American epidemiologist

See also
Steve Cummins